This is a list of Rolls-Royce Merlin variants. Engines of a similar power output were typically assigned different model numbers based on supercharger or propeller gear ratios, differences in cooling system or carburettors, engine block construction, starting system, or arrangement of engine controls. All Merlin engines were "right hand tractor", i.e. the propeller rotated clockwise viewed from behind, unless otherwise noted.

Variant table

References

Notes

Bibliography

Air Ministry. Pilot's Notes for Spitfire Mark F.VII - Merlin 64 or 71 engine; Mark F.VIII-Merlin 63,66 or 70 engine. Air Publication 1565G & H -P.N. London, UK: Air Ministry, December 1943.
 Bridgman, L. Jane's fighting aircraft of World War II. London: Crescent, 1998. 
 Harvey-Bailey, A. The Merlin in Perspective - the combat years. Derby, England: Rolls-Royce Heritage Trust, 1983. 
 Lumsden, Alec. British Piston Engines and their Aircraft. Marlborough, Wiltshire: Airlife Publishing, 2003. .
 Price, Alfred. The Spitfire Story. London: Jane's Publishing Company Ltd., 1982. .
 Robertson, Bruce. Spitfire: The Story of a Famous Fighter. Hemel Hempstead, Hertfordshire, UK: Model & Allied Publications Ltd., 1960. Third revised edition 1973. .

External links

Merlin